James T. Estes (born August 12, 1964) is an American professional golfer.

Estes was born in Washington, D.C. He played college golf at the University of Tennessee and the University of Maryland. He turned professional in 1988.

Estes played on the Nationwide Tour in 1990, 1994, 1996–97, and 1999–2000, winning the 1996 Nike Inland Empire Open. He played on the PGA Tour in 1998, where his best finish was T-16 at the Greater Greensboro Chrysler Classic.

Estes also worked as a club professional and won the 1995 PGA Club Professional Player of the Year award from the PGA of America.

Estes is Director of Golf Instruction at Olney Golf Park in Olney, Maryland. He is co-founder of the Salute Military Golf Association.

Amateur wins
1985 Maryland Amateur

Professional wins (2)

Nike Tour wins (1)

Other wins (1)
1989 Greater Ozarks Open

Results in major championships

CUT = missed the halfway cut
Note: Estes never played in the Masters Tournament or The Open Championship.

See also
1997 PGA Tour Qualifying School graduates

References

External links

Profile at Middle Atlantic Section of PGA of America

American male golfers
Tennessee Volunteers men's golfers
Maryland Terrapins men's golfers
PGA Tour golfers
PGA Tour Champions golfers
Golfers from Washington, D.C.
Golfers from Maryland
People from Germantown, Maryland
1964 births
Living people